Michelle Melody Fine (born December 28, 1952) is a distinguished professor at the City University of New York and has her training in Social and Personality Psychology, Environmental Psychology, American Studies, and Urban Education. Her research includes the topics of social injustice and resistance and urban education. Fine is also an author and has written several works, one of her most known being Muslim American Youth (2008).

Fine's work integrates critical psychological theory with feminist and post-colonial theory using participants and holds strong commitments to research for social justice.

Career
Michelle Fine has a Ph.D. in Social Psychology from Teachers College of Columbia University. She is a professor of Critical Psychology, Women's Studies, American Studies, and Urban Education at the Graduate Center.
She focuses on social injustice in terms of research and has given expert testimonies in legal cases such as The Military College of South Carolina and Valenzuela et al. vs. O’Connell and the California State Department of Education in which people of color in urban settings were not given adequate educational opportunities by California schools. She has also provided expert testimonies for women and influenced the victories of women who sued for acceptance to the Citadel Military Academy in Shannon Richey Faulkner and the US v. James E Jones, et al. for The Citadel. Later, she participated in drafting the Psychologists Amicus Brief in Graham and Sullivan v. State of Florida.

Fine is a founding faculty member of the Public Science Project, which produces theoretically informed and historically enriched research in social policy debates and organizing movements for educational equity and human rights. The Public Science Project has received more than $1,000,000 in grants from public institutions and private foundations that include the Rockefeller Foundation, Overbrook Foundation, and the Open Society Foundation. Fine has received degrees from Bank Street College and Lewis and Clark University and is also a commencement speaker.

Work
Fine works in the Graduate Center of the City University of New York. She is a distinguished professor in Social Psychology, American Studies, Urban Education, and Women's Studies. She has been employed at this university since 1992. Previously, Fine worked for twelve years as the Goldie Anna Chaired Professor of Human Development at the University of Pennsylvania. At the City University of New York, she works to address theoretical questions focused around social injustice in relation to both youth in schools and criminal justice. Fine has worked with her students to publish over 80 articles in peer-reviewed U.S. and European psychological journals. She has been published in competitive journals in both psychological and educational fields over the past thirty years, including the Journal of Social Issues, the American Psychologist, the Counseling Psychologist, Harvard Educational Review, and Teachers College Record.

Awards
Fine has been a visiting scholar at the University of New Zealand. She has also been a Fulbright scholar at the Institute for Arab Studies at Haifi University. She and colleagues have given expert testimonies in over a dozen legal victories centered around gender, race, and class equity in education. 
Among other awards, Fine has received the 2013 American Psychological Association Award for Distinguished Contributions to Research in Public Policy, the 2012 Henry Murray Award from the Society for Personality and Social Psychology of the APA, the 2010 Social Justice and Higher Education Award from the college and Community Fellowship for her work in prisons, and the 2011 Elizabeth Hurlock Beckman Award for her legacy as a mentor over the past 25 years.

Selected works
In The Changing Politics of Education: Privatization and the Dispossessed Lives of Those Left Behind, Fine argues for the idea of equal education for all. She brings up the topic of privatization of schools including charter schools and other private institutions. The idea that comes up most passionately is that democracy is just a cover for meritocracy and the future of the US is based on the success of our children.
Charter Schools and the Corporate Makeover of Public Education explores the gap between the promise and the performance of charter schools. The authors do not defend the public school system, which for decades has failed primarily poor children of color. They use empirical evidence to determine whether charter schooling is a valid alternative for poor children of color, and offers an authentic alternative for these children. Fine also writes about the history of charter schools in public education.
Revolutionizing Education offers a broad basis for understanding this research methodology. With a combination of theory and practice, this collection combines student writings alongside those of major scholars in the field. While remaining sensitive to the methodological challenges of qualitative inquiry, Revolutionizing Education is the first definitive statement of Youth-led Participatory Action Research and how it relates to education.
Muslim American Youth is about post-9/11 America and how Muslim Americans are treated differently. These youth must fight against popular cultural representations of Muslim-men-as-terrorists and Muslim-women-as-oppressed. These are shown through the suspicious gaze of peers, teachers, and strangers, and police. The concern about not being American citizens when they are has led to controversy and a lack of understanding among their peers.
Beyond Silenced Voices is an account that addresses the humanity of students, specifically related to the power schools do or do not have to improve the lives of the educated.
In Working Method, Michelle Fine provides a guide to understanding and participating in contemporary social research.
Off white: essays on race, power and resistance (2004) This collection of essays analyzes white privilege and how this concept is embedded in society today. In addition, authors consider politics and practices that challenge or encourage white privilege.
In Echoes of Brown: Youth documenting and performing the legacy of Brown v. Board of Education, a novel and DVD pairing, Fine walks readers through the creation of the Art and Social Justice Institute. Interviews with urban teenagers and their experience with public school are seen through the lens of the infamous Brown vs. Board of Education case.

References

External links

1948 births
Living people
American women psychologists
21st-century American psychologists
Teachers College, Columbia University alumni
City College of New York faculty
20th-century American psychologists